Thalattosuchia is a clade of marine crocodylomorphs from the Early Jurassic to the Early Cretaceous that had a cosmopolitan distribution. They are colloquially referred to as marine crocodiles or sea crocodiles, though they are not members of Crocodilia and records from Thailand and China suggest that some members lived in freshwater. The clade contains two major subgroupings, the Teleosauroidea and Metriorhynchoidea. Teleosauroids are not greatly specialised for oceanic life, with back osteoderms similar to other crocodyliformes. Within Metriorhynchoidea, the Metriorhynchidae displayed extreme adaptions for life in the open ocean, including the transformation of limbs into flippers, the development of a tail fluke, and smooth, scaleless skin.

Taxonomy

The term Thalattosuchia was coined by Fraas in 1901. Various authors considered Thalattosuchia an infraorder or a suborder within "Mesosuchia". However, the term "Mesosuchia" is a paraphyletic group, and as such is no longer used. For consistency, the Thalattosuchia are here placed at suborder rank, although the order that contains it is unnamed. The exact phylogenetic position of Thalattosuchia is uncertain, with them either being interpreted as members of Neosuchia alongside other aquatic crocodylomorphs, or more basal members of Crocodylomorpha, with the similarities to neosuchians being as a result of convergent evolution. The group consists of two major subgroupings, Teleosauroidea (containing the families Machimosauridae and Teleosauridae), and Metriorhynchoidea (containing Metriorhynchidae and some more basal taxa).

The oldest possible records of thalattosuchians date to the Sinemurian stage of the Early Jurassic, represented by indeterminate remains from Chile and France. However, they cannot be assigned to the group with confidence as they lack diagnostic characters. The oldest confirmed member of the group is Turnersuchus from the Pliensbachian of England, which appears to be basal to both Teleosauroidea and Metriorhynchoidea. The latest records of the group date to the Early Cretaceous. Some of the early members of Teleosauridae have been discovered in non-marine deposits. The systematics of the genus Pelagosaurus are confused, with differencing topologies placing it as either a teleosaurid, or as the sister taxon to a Teleosauridae + Metriorhynchoidea clade. Others considered Pelagosaurus to be a basal metriorhynchoid.

See also 
List of thalattosuchian-bearing stratigraphic units
List of marine reptiles

References

Further reading
Fraas, E. (1902). "Die Meer-Krocodilier (Thalattosuchia) des oberen Jura unter specieller Berücksichtigung von Dacosaurus und Geosaurus". Paleontographica 49: 1-72.

External links
"Ancient ocean-going crocodiles mimicked whales and dolphins" at The Guardian, 20 Apr 2020

Prehistoric animal suborders
Tetrapod suborders
Prehistoric marine crocodylomorphs
Jurassic crocodylomorphs
Early Cretaceous crocodylomorphs
Sinemurian first appearances
Early Cretaceous extinctions